Glière Music College was the first Ukrainian music conservatory established in the late 19th century in Kyiv. In the early 20th century it was split into two music schools, Glière Music College and Kyiv Conservatory (now Kyiv Academy of Music). Over the past century, many world-famous musicians have graduated from this school, such as Vladimir Horowitz and Mélovin.

In 2008 it became the R. Glier Kyiv Institute of Music. Since 2018 - R. Glier Kyiv Municipal Academy of Music.

Notable alumni
Jerry Heil, singer
Tina Karol, singer
Mélovin, singer
Zlata Ognevich, singer
Liudmyla Monastyrska, Ukrainian spinto soprano
Vladyslav Buialskyi, opera singer

References

Music in Kyiv
Music schools in Ukraine
Schools in Kyiv